Waaskiinaysay Ziibi Inc. Development Corporation is a First Nations economic development corporation in northern Ontario. It includes the First Nations of:

 Animbiigoo Zaagi'igan Anishinaabek First Nation
 Bingwi Neyaashi Anishinaabek First Nation
 Biinjitiwaabik Zaaging Anishinaabek First Nation
 Red Rock Indian Band
 Whitesand First Nation

First Nations organizations in Ontario